Man's World may refer to:

 Man's World (album), by Mountain, 1996
 Man's World (magazine), an Indian men's lifestyle magazine
 "Man's World" (song), by Marina, 2020
 A Man's World (1918 film), an American silent film directed by Herbert Blaché
 A Man's World (1942 film), an American film directed by Charles Barton

See also
 Mann's World, a 2011 album by Mann
 "It's a Man's Man's Man's World", a 1966 song by James Brown